The Liberian ambassador in Washington, D. C. is the official representative of the Government in Monrovia to the Government of the United States and accredited in Ottawa.

List of representatives

See also 
 Embassy of Liberia, Washington, D.C.
 List of diplomatic missions of Liberia
 Foreign relations of Liberia
 President of Liberia

References

External links 
 Diplomatic Representation for Republic of Liberia (1947-2004), Foreign Embassies in the U.S. and Their Ambassadors, U.S. Department of State Archive, 2007.

 
United States
Liberia